Ùisdean is a Scottish Gaelic masculine given name. Variant forms include Uisdean and Hùisdean. The names are derived from the Old Norse personal name Eysteinn, *Aystein (later Øysteinn). Eysteinn is composed of the elements ey, ei, meaning "always, forever"; and steinn, meaning "stone". An anglicised form of Ùisdean and Uisdean is Hugh.

People with the name

Hugh of Sleat (1437–1498), Scottish clan chief
Hugh MacDonald (Scottish politician) (1929–2013), Scottish politician
Hugh Dan MacLennan (Scottish Gaelic: Ùisdean MacIllFhinnein), Scottish broadcaster, author and academic

Notes

Citations

References

Scottish Gaelic masculine given names
Scottish masculine given names